Roots and Branches (literally "My Brothers and Sisters") is a Chinese film released in 2001. It was the third highest grossing Chinese film of 2001 at the domestic box office, but was not well received critically.

Plot
The parents of a family of four die in a blizzard and the children (two boys and two girls) are brought up separately. Twenty years later, the daughter who was adopted and taken abroad is returning to China as an internationally renowned classical musician and seeks to reconnect with her siblings, who are all living very different lives.

The father of the children, a music teacher, is played by rock star Cui Jian, who wrote a song, Meng ("Dream"), especially to be performed by his "pupils" in the film.

Cast
 Cui Jian
 Gigi Leung as Qi Sitian
 Jiang Wu as Qi Yiku
 Xia Yu as Qi Miao
 Chen Shi

References

External links
 

2001 films
2001 romantic drama films
2000s Mandarin-language films
Chinese romantic drama films
2000s Chinese films